The China Cultural Centre is a cultural center about China in Central Area, Singapore. It should not be confused with the Singapore Chinese Cultural Centre, a local charity patroned by Prime Minister Lee Hsien Loong, located at 1 Straits Boulevard.

History
The cultural center was built at the former People's Association clubhouse. The groundbreaking ceremony for the cultural center was held on 15 November 2010 which was officiated by Chinese Vice President Xi Jinping and Singaporean Senior Minister Goh Chok Tong. Construction started from January 2013 and was completed in April 2015. On 7 November 2015, Chinese President Xi Jinping and Singaporean Emeritus Senior Minister Goh Chok Tong officiated the opening ceremony of the center.

Architecture
The cultural center was designed by architect Liu Thai Ker. It is housed in an 11-story building. It features library, classrooms and multipurpose hall.

Transportation
The cultural center is accessible within walking distance of Bras Basah MRT station.

See also
 List of tourist attractions in Singapore
 China–Singapore relations

References

External links
 

2015 establishments in Singapore
Event venues in Singapore